This was the first edition of the tournament.

Marcus Daniell and Philipp Oswald won the title, defeating Juan Sebastián Cabal and Robert Farah in the final, 6–3, 6–4.

Seeds

Draw

Draw

References
Main Draw

Forte Village Sardegna Open - Doubles
Sardegna Open